Nina Müller, née Wörz (born 14 November 1980 in Bremen) is a German handball player. She plays for the German club Thüringer HC and for the German national team, having made her international debut on 19 February 1999 against Poland.

Wörz was member of the German national team that won the World Championship bronze medal in 2007 and also participated at the 2008 Summer Olympic Games in Beijing, where Germany placed eleventh. She was also present at the 2008 European Women's Handball Championship and the 2009 World Women's Handball Championship in China. In 2010, she took part on the European Championship, where Germany achieved the thirteenth position. She married her former national teammate, Susann Müller, in 2016.

Achievements
Bundesliga:
Winner: 2002, 2006
German Cup:
Winner: 2006
EHF Cup:
Winner: 2010
World Championship:
Bronze Medalist: 2007

References

External links
 Profile on Randers HK official website

1980 births
Living people
Sportspeople from Bremen
German female handball players
Handball players at the 2008 Summer Olympics
Olympic handball players of Germany
Expatriate handball players
German expatriate sportspeople in Denmark
German expatriate sportspeople in Hungary
Siófok KC players
Lesbian sportswomen
German LGBT sportspeople
LGBT handball players